Kumar Kartikeya (born 26 December 1997) is an Indian cricketer. He made his List A debut for Madhya Pradesh in the 2018–19 Vijay Hazare Trophy on 26 September 2018. He made his first-class debut for Madhya Pradesh in the 2018–19 Ranji Trophy on 28 November 2018. He made his Twenty20 debut for Madhya Pradesh in the 2018–19 Syed Mushtaq Ali Trophy on 2 March 2019. In April 2022, the Mumbai Indians named him as Arshad Khan's replacement for the 2022 Indian Premier League (IPL), after Khan was ruled out due to an injury.

References

External links
 

1997 births
Living people
Indian cricketers
Madhya Pradesh cricketers
Mumbai Indians cricketers